Paul Joshua "Sonny" Sandoval (born May 16, 1974) is an American musician and songwriter. He is best known as co-founder and the lead vocalist of nu metal band P.O.D.

Biography

Sandoval was born in San Diego, California. to a Chamorro-Hawaiian mother and a Mexican-Italian father. He grew up in the Otay Mesa neighborhood of South San Diego which was a Chicano barrio. When he was eighteen, Sandoval's mother was diagnosed with leukemia. During her illness, Sandoval was greatly influenced by his mother's faith as a devout Christian. He pursued a career as an MC and later joined the band Enoch, a group started by Wuv Bernardo, Gabe Portillo and Marcos Curiel, which, with the addition of Sandoval, later became P.O.D. (initialism for "Payable On Death"). Sandoval states his musical roots as reggae, rock, and rap, all of which are apparent in P.O.D.

Career

P.O.D. 
Sandoval is best known as co-founder and the lead vocalist of the metal band P.O.D. Over the course of their career, the band has received three Grammy Award nominations, contributed to numerous motion picture soundtracks and toured internationally. They have sold over 12 million records worldwide. With their third studio album, The Fundamental Elements of Southtown, P.O.D. achieved their initial mainstream success; the album was certified platinum by the RIAA in 2000.

The Whosoevers
Since 2008, Sandoval has been part of an outreach group, The Whosoevers, with Ryan Ries, Lacey Sturm, formerly of Flyleaf, and Brian Welch, guitarist for the nu metal band Korn.

Other work 
Sandoval appeared in Project 86's self-titled album in the song "Six Sirens". In 2004, he contributed to two tracks on Anastacia's self titled album, "Seasons Change" and "I Do". He has been named number 63 in Hit Parader'''s Top 100 Metal Vocalists of All Time in 2006.

In 2009, Sandoval appeared on Tribal Seeds' new album The Harvest, in the song "Warning". In 2010, Sandoval appeared on War of Ages' fourth album release Eternal, in the song "Eternal". In 2010, Sandoval appeared on Lecrae's fourth album release Rehab, in the song "Children of the Light". In 2011, Sandoval appeared on Dominic Balli's single, "American Dream". In 2012, Sandoval appeared on For Today's fourth album release Immortal, in the song "The Only Name". Also in 2013, Sandoval appeared  on the track "Something Better" released on Flyleaf's EP Who We Are. He appeared on Islander's album, Violence & Destruction on the track, "Criminals".

Personal life

 Family 
He and his wife Shannon married in 1996, and have two daughters, Nevaeh and Marley, and a son, Justice. Sandoval is widely credited with the sudden popularity of the name Nevaeh, which, as he revealed on MTV Cribs, is "heaven" spelled backwards.

Appearance
For most of P.O.D.'s career, Sandoval was well known for his dreadlocks (which, by the release of the video for "Going in Blind", had reached the length of his waist), but since the release of P.O.D.'s seventh studio album, When Angels & Serpents Dance, he has cut them off.

Discography

P.O.D.Snuff the Punk (1994)Brown (1996)The Fundamental Elements of Southtown (1999)Satellite (2001)Payable on Death (2003)Testify (2006)When Angels & Serpents Dance (2008)Murdered Love (2012)SoCal Sessions (2014)
 The Awakening (2015)
 Circles (2018)

Guest appearances
 "Six Sirens" by Project 86 on the album Project 86 (1998)
 "America" by Santana (with P.O.D.) on the album Shaman (2002)
 "Seasons Change" & "I Do" by Anastacia on the album, Anastacia (2004)
 "Warning" by Tribal Seeds on their album, The Harvest (2009)
 "Eternal" by War of Ages on their album, Eternal (2010)
 "Children of the Light" by Lecrae on his album, Rehab (2010)
 "American Dream" by Dominic Balli on his album, American Dream (Dominic Balli album) (2011) 
 "The Only Name" by For Today on their album, Immortal (2012)
 "Something Better" Flyleaf on their EP, Who We Are (2013)
 "Criminals" by Islander on their album, Violence & Destruction (2014)
 "Chasing the Horizon" by Noize MC (2019)
 "They Don't Like It" by Fire from the Gods (2019)
 "Magic Eyes" by Nights Like Thieves (2020)
 "All or Nothing" by Ill Niño (2021)
 "Nemesis" by Manafest (2022)
 “Lights, Camera, Action” by Islander (2022)

References

External links
 The Whosoevers Official Website
 Official website
 The Warriors Tour Official Site
 P.O.D. Promotions Crew: Official Street Team
 theSouthtown.com
 MTV EXIT Concerts
 Tony Hawk's American Wasteland Xbox Live VNR

1974 births
Living people
American male singers
American heavy metal singers
American rappers
American performers of Christian music
Converts to Christianity
Musicians from San Diego
American people of Italian descent
American rappers of Mexican descent
Native Hawaiian people
Chamorro people
Nu metal singers
Chicano rock musicians
21st-century American rappers
Rappers from California
21st-century American male musicians
P.O.D. members